Permafrost is ground that continuously remains below 0 °C (32 °F) for two or more years, located on land or under the ocean. Most common in the Northern Hemisphere, around 15% of the Northern Hemisphere or 11% of the global surface is underlain by permafrost, with the total area of around 18 million km2. This includes substantial areas of Alaska, Greenland, Canada and Siberia. It can also be located on mountaintops in the Southern Hemisphere and beneath ice-free areas in the Antarctic.

Permafrost does not have to be the first layer that is on the ground. It can be from several centimeters to several hundred meters deep under the Earth's surface. It frequently occurs in ground ice, but it can also be present in non-porous bedrock. Permafrost is formed from ice holding various types of soil, sand, and rock in combination.

Permafrost contains large amounts of biomass and decomposed biomass that has been stored as methane and carbon dioxide, making tundra soil a carbon sink. As global warming heats the ecosystem and causes soil thawing, the permafrost carbon cycle accelerates and releases much of these soil-contained greenhouse gases into the atmosphere, creating a feedback cycle that increases climate change. Thawing of permafrost is one of the effects of climate change. While emissions from thawing permafrost will be significant enough to lead to additional warming, they will likely not be enough to trigger a self-reinforcing feedback leading to "runaway warming".

Study of permafrost

In contrast to the relative dearth of reports on frozen ground in North America prior to World War II, a vast literature on basic permafrost science and the engineering aspects of permafrost was available in Russian. Some Russian authors relate permafrost research with the name Alexander von Middendorff (1815–1894). However, Russian scientists also realized, that Karl Ernst von Baer must be given the attribute "founder of scientific permafrost research". In 1843, Baer's original study “materials for the study of the perennial ground-ice” was ready to be printed. Baer's detailed study consists of 218 pages and was written in German language, as he was a Baltic German scientist. He was teaching at the  University of Königsberg and became a member of the St Petersburg Academy of Sciences. This world's first permafrost textbook was conceived as a complete work and ready for printing in 1843. But it remained lost for around 150 years. However, from 1838 onwards, Baer published several individual publications on permafrost. The Russian Academy of Sciences honoured Baer with the publication of a tentative Russian translation of his study in 1942.

These facts were completely forgotten after the Second World War. Thus in 2001 the discovery of the typescript from 1843 in the library archives of the University of Giessen and its annotated publication was a scientific sensation. The full text of Baer's original work is available online (234 pages). The editor added to the facsimile reprint a preface in English, two colour permafrost maps of Eurasia and some figures of permafrost features. Baer's text is introduced with detailed comments and references on additional 66 pages written by the Estonian historian Erki Tammiksaar. The work is notable because Baer's observations on permafrost distribution and periglacial morphological descriptions are seen as largely correct to the present day. With his compilation and analysis of all available data on ground ice and permafrost, Baer laid the foundation for the modern permafrost terminology. Baer's southern limit of permafrost in Eurasia drawn in 1843 corresponds well with the actual southern limit on the Circum-Arctic Map of Permafrost and Ground Ice Conditions of the International Permafrost Association (edited by J. Brown et al.).

Beginning in 1942, Siemon William Muller delved into the relevant Russian literature held by the Library of Congress and the U.S. Geological Survey Library so that he was able to furnish the government an engineering field guide and a technical report about permafrost by 1943", the year in which he coined the term as a contraction of permanently frozen ground. Although originally classified (as U.S. Army. Office of the Chief of Engineers, Strategic Engineering Study, no. 62, 1943), in 1947 a revised report was released publicly, which is regarded as the first North American treatise on the subject.

Classification and extent

Permafrost is soil, rock or sediment that is frozen for more than two consecutive years. In areas not covered by ice, it exists beneath a layer of soil, rock or sediment, which freezes and thaws annually and is called the "active layer". Active layer thickness varies with the season, but is 0.3 to 4 meters thick (shallow along the Arctic coast; deep in southern Siberia and the Qinghai-Tibetan Plateau).

The extent of permafrost is displayed in terms of permafrost zones, which are defined according to the area underlain by permafrost as continuous (90%–100%), discontinuous (50%–90%), sporadic (10%–50%), and isolated patches (10% or less). These permafrost zones cover together approximately 22% of the Northern Hemisphere. Continuous permafrost zone covers slightly more than half of this area, discontinuous permafrost around 20 percent, and sporadic permafrost together with isolated patches little less than 30 percent. Because permafrost zones are not entirely underlain by permafrost, only 15% of the ice-free area of the Northern Hemisphere is actually underlain by permafrost. Most of this area is found in Siberia, northern Canada, Alaska and Greenland. Beneath the active layer annual temperature swings of permafrost become smaller with depth. The deepest depth of permafrost occurs where geothermal heat maintains a temperature above freezing. Above that bottom limit there may be permafrost with a consistent annual temperature—"isothermal permafrost".

Continuity of coverage
Permafrost typically forms in any climate where the mean annual air temperature is lower than the freezing point of water. Exceptions are found in humid boreal forests, such as in Northern Scandinavia and the North-Eastern part of European Russia west of the Urals, where snow acts as an insulating blanket. Glaciated areas may also be exceptions. Since all glaciers are warmed at their base by geothermal heat, temperate glaciers, which are near the pressure-melting point throughout, may have liquid water at the interface with the ground and are therefore free of underlying permafrost. "Fossil" cold anomalies in the Geothermal gradient in areas where deep permafrost developed during the Pleistocene persist down to several hundred metres. This is evident from temperature measurements in boreholes in North America and Europe.

Discontinuous permafrost
The below-ground temperature varies less from season to season than the air temperature, with mean annual temperatures tending to increase with depth as a result of the geothermal crustal gradient. Thus, if the mean annual air temperature is only slightly below , permafrost will form only in spots that are sheltered—usually with a northern or southern aspect (in north and south hemispheres respectively) —creating discontinuous permafrost.
In soil science, the sporadic permafrost zone is abbreviated SPZ and the extensive discontinuous permafrost zone DPZ. Exceptions occur in un-glaciated Siberia and Alaska where the present depth of permafrost is a relic of climatic conditions during glacial ages where winters were up to  colder than those of today.

Continuous permafrost

At mean annual soil surface temperatures below  the influence of aspect can never be sufficient to thaw permafrost and a zone of continuous permafrost (abbreviated to CPZ) forms. A line of continuous permafrost in the Northern Hemisphere represents the most southern border where land is covered by continuous permafrost or glacial ice. The line of continuous permafrost varies around the world northward or southward due to regional climatic changes. In the southern hemisphere, most of the equivalent line would fall within the Southern Ocean if there were land there. Most of the Antarctic continent is overlain by glaciers, under which much of the terrain is subject to basal melting. The exposed land of Antarctica is substantially underlain with permafrost, some of which is subject to warming and thawing along the coastline.

Alpine permafrost
Alpine permafrost occurs at elevations with low enough average temperatures to sustain perennially frozen ground; much alpine permafrost is discontinuous. Estimates of the total area of alpine permafrost vary. Bockheim and Munroe combined three sources and made the tabulated estimates by region, totaling .

Alpine permafrost in the Andes has not been mapped. Its extent has been modeled to assess the amount of water bound up in these areas. In 2009, a researcher from Alaska found permafrost at the  level on Africa's highest peak, Mount Kilimanjaro, approximately 3° south of the equator.

Subsea permafrost 
Subsea permafrost occurs beneath the seabed and exists in the continental shelves of the polar regions. These areas formed during the last ice age, when a larger portion of Earth's water was bound up in ice sheets on land and when sea levels were low. As the ice sheets melted to again become seawater, the permafrost became submerged shelves under relatively warm and salty boundary conditions, compared to surface permafrost. Therefore, subsea permafrost exists in conditions that lead to its diminishment. According to Osterkamp, subsea permafrost is a factor in the "design, construction, and operation of coastal facilities, structures founded on the seabed, artificial islands, sub-sea pipelines, and wells drilled for exploration and production." It also contains gas hydrates in places, which are a "potential abundant source of energy" but may also destabilize as subsea permafrost warms and thaws, producing large amounts of methane gas, which is a potent greenhouse gas. Scientists report with high confidence that the extent of subsea permafrost is decreasing, and 97% of permafrost under Arctic ice shelves is currently thinning.

Manifestations

Base depth

Permafrost extends to a base depth where geothermal heat from the Earth and the mean annual temperature at the surface achieve an equilibrium temperature of 0 °C. The base depth of permafrost reaches   in the northern Lena and Yana River basins in Siberia. The geothermal gradient is the rate of increasing temperature with respect to increasing depth in the Earth's interior. Away from tectonic plate boundaries, it is about 25–30 °C/km (124–139 °F/mi) near the surface in most of the world. It varies with the thermal conductivity of geologic material and is less for permafrost in soil than in bedrock.

Calculations indicate that the time required to form the deep permafrost underlying Prudhoe Bay, Alaska was over a half-million years. This extended over several glacial and interglacial cycles of the Pleistocene and suggests that the present climate of Prudhoe Bay is probably considerably warmer than it has been on average over that period. Such warming over the past 15,000 years is widely accepted. The table to the right shows that the first hundred metres of permafrost forms relatively quickly but that deeper levels take progressively longer.

Massive ground ice

When the ice content of a permafrost exceeds 250 percent (ice to dry soil by mass) it is classified as massive ice. Massive ice bodies can range in composition, in every conceivable gradation from icy mud to pure ice. Massive icy beds have a minimum thickness of at least 2 m and a short diameter of at least 10 m. First recorded North American observations were by European scientists at Canning River, Alaska in 1919. Russian literature provides an earlier date of 1735 and 1739 during the Great North Expedition by P. Lassinius and Kh. P. Laptev, respectively. Two categories of massive ground ice are buried surface ice and intrasedimental ice (also called constitutional ice).

Buried surface ice may derive from snow, frozen lake or sea ice, aufeis (stranded river ice) and—probably the most prevalent—buried glacial ice.

Intrasedimental ice forms by in-place freezing of subterranean waters and is dominated by segregational ice which results from the crystallizational differentiation taking place during the freezing of wet sediments, accompanied by water migrating to the freezing front.

Intrasedimental or constitutional ice has been widely observed and studied across Canada and also includes intrusive and injection ice.

Additionally, ice wedges—a separate type of ground ice—produce recognizable patterned ground or tundra polygons. Ice wedges form in a pre-existing geological substrate and were first described in 1919.

Landforms

Permafrost processes manifest themselves in large-scale land forms, such as palsas and pingos and smaller-scale phenomena, such as patterned ground found in arctic, periglacial and alpine areas. In ice-rich permafrost areas, melting of ground ice initiates thermokarst landforms such as thermokarst lakes, thaw slumps, thermal-erosion gullies, and active layer detachments.

Carbon cycle in permafrost
The permafrost carbon cycle (Arctic Carbon Cycle) deals with the transfer of carbon from permafrost soils to terrestrial vegetation and microbes, to the atmosphere, back to vegetation, and finally back to permafrost soils through burial and sedimentation due to cryogenic processes. Some of this carbon is transferred to the ocean and other portions of the globe through the global carbon cycle. The cycle includes the exchange of carbon dioxide and methane between terrestrial components and the atmosphere, as well as the transfer of carbon between land and water as methane, dissolved organic carbon, dissolved inorganic carbon, particulate inorganic carbon and particulate organic carbon.

Effects of climate change 

Arctic permafrost has been diminishing for decades. The consequence is thawing soil, which may be weaker, and release of methane, which contributes to an increased rate of global warming as part of a feedback loop caused by microbial decomposition. Wetlands drying out from drainage or evaporation compromises the ability of plants and animals to survive. When permafrost continues to diminish, many climate change scenarios will be amplified. In areas where permafrost is high, nearby human infrastructure may be damaged severely by the thawing of permafrost. It is believed that carbon storage in permafrost globally is approximately 1600 gigatons; equivalent to twice the atmospheric pool.

Historical changes 

At the Last Glacial Maximum, continuous permafrost covered a much greater area than it does today, covering all of ice-free Europe south to about Szeged (southeastern Hungary) and the Sea of Azov (then dry land) and East Asia south to present-day Changchun and Abashiri. In North America, only an extremely narrow belt of permafrost existed south of the ice sheet at about the latitude of New Jersey through southern Iowa and northern Missouri, but permafrost was more extensive in the drier western regions where it extended to the southern border of Idaho and Oregon. In the southern hemisphere, there is some evidence for former permafrost from this period in central Otago and Argentine Patagonia, but was probably discontinuous, and is related to the tundra.

Thaw 

By definition, permafrost is ground that remains frozen for two or more years. The ground can consist of many substrate materials, including bedrock, sediment, organic matter, water or ice. Frozen ground is that which is below the freezing point of water, whether or not water is present in the substrate. Ground ice is not always present, as may be the case with nonporous bedrock, but it frequently occurs and may be present in amounts exceeding the potential hydraulic saturation of the thawed substrate.

During thaw, the ice content of the soil melts and, as the water drains or evaporates, causes the soil structure to weaken and sometimes become viscous until it regains strength with decreasing moisture content. Thawing can also influence the rate of change of soil gases with the atmosphere. One visible sign of permafrost degradation is the random displacement of trees from their vertical orientation in permafrost areas.

Effect on slope stability
Over the past century, an increasing number of alpine rock slope failure events in mountain ranges around the world have been recorded. It is expected that the high number of structural failures is due to permafrost thawing, which is thought to be linked to climate change. Permafrost thawing is thought to have contributed to the 1987 Val Pola landslide that killed 22 people in the Italian Alps. In mountain ranges, much of the structural stability can be attributed to glaciers and permafrost. As climate warms, permafrost thaws, which results in a less stable mountain structure, and ultimately more slope failures.

McSaveney reported massive rock and ice falls (up to 11.8 million m3), earthquakes (up to 3.9 Richter), floods (up to 7.8 million m3 water), and rapid rock-ice flow to long distances (up to 7.5 km at 60 m/s) caused by “instability of slopes” in high mountain permafrost. Instability of slopes in permafrost at elevated temperatures near freezing point in warming permafrost is related to effective stress and buildup of pore-water pressure in these soils.  Kia and his co-inventors invented a new filter-less rigid piezometer (FRP) for measuring pore-water pressure in partially frozen soils such as warming permafrost soils. They extended the use of effective stress concept to partially frozen soils for use in slope stability analysis of warming permafrost slopes. The use of effective stress concept has many advantages such as ability to extend the concepts of "Critical State Soil Mechanics" into frozen ground engineering.

In high mountains rockfalls may be caused by thawing of rock masses with permafrost.

Frozen debris lobes
According to the University of Alaska Fairbanks, frozen debris lobes (FDLs) are "slow-moving landslides composed of soil, rocks, trees, and ice that occur in permafrost. As of December 2021, there were 43 frozen debris lobes identified in the southern Brooks Range along the Trans Alaska Pipeline System (TAPS) corridor and the main highway linking Interior Alaska and the Alaska North Slope—the Dalton Highway. Based on measurements of a frozen debris-lobe southern Brooks Range in Alaska taken from 2008 to 2010, researchers found accelerated movement as ice in deeper layers of soil melted with rising temperatures. Ice within the soil melts, causing loss of soil strength, accelerated movement, and potential debris flows. They raised concerns of a future potential hazard of one debris lobe to both the Trans Alaska Pipeline System and the main highway linking Interior Alaska and the North Slope—Dalton Highway.

Ecological consequences
In the northern circumpolar region, permafrost contains 1700 billion tons of organic material equaling almost half of all organic material in all soils. This pool was built up over thousands of years and is only slowly degraded under the cold conditions in the Arctic. The amount of carbon sequestered in permafrost is four times the carbon that has been released to the atmosphere due to human activities in modern time. One manifestation of this is yedoma, which is an organic-rich (about 2% carbon by mass) Pleistocene-age loess permafrost with ice content of 50–90% by volume.

Formation of permafrost has significant consequences for ecological systems, primarily due to constraints imposed upon rooting zones, but also due to limitations on den and burrow geometries for fauna requiring subsurface homes. Secondary effects impact species dependent on plants and animals whose habitat is constrained by the permafrost. One of the most widespread examples is the dominance of black spruce in extensive permafrost areas, since this species can tolerate rooting pattern constrained to the near surface.

The number of bacteria in permafrost soil varies widely, typically from 1 to 1000 million per gram of soil. Most of these bacteria and fungi in permafrost soil cannot be cultured in the laboratory, but the identity of the microorganisms can be revealed by DNA-based techniques.

Global warming has been increasing permafrost slope disturbances and sediment supplies to fluvial systems, resulting in exceptional increases in river sediment.

Climate change feedback

Preservation of organisms in permafrost

Microbes 
Scientists predict that up to 1021 microbes, including fungi and bacteria in addition to viruses, will be released from melting ice per year. Often, these microbes will be released directly into the ocean. Due to the migratory nature of many species of fish and birds, it is possible that these microbes have a high transmission rate.

Permafrost in eastern Switzerland was analyzed by researchers in 2016 at an alpine permafrost site called “Muot-da-Barba-Peider”.This site had a diverse microbial community with various bacteria and eukaryotic groups present. Prominent bacteria groups included phylum Acidobacteriota, Actinomycetota, AD3, Bacteroidota, Chloroflexota, Gemmatimonadota, OD1, Nitrospirota, Planctomycetota, Pseudomonadota, and Verrucomicrobiota. Prominent eukaryotic fungi included Ascomycota, Basidiomycota, and Zygomycota. In the present species, scientists observed a variety of adaptations for sub-zero conditions, including reduced and anaerobic metabolic processes.

A 2016 outbreak of anthrax in the Yamal Peninsula is believed to be due to thawing permafrost. Also present in Siberian permafrost are two species of virus: Pithovirus sibericum and Mollivirus sibericum. Both of these are approximately 30,000 years old and considered giant viruses due to the fact that they are larger in size than most bacteria and have genomes larger than other viruses. Both viruses are still infective, as seen by their ability to infect Acanthamoeba, a genus of amoebas.

Freezing at low temperatures has been shown to preserve the infectivity of viruses. Caliciviruses, influenza A, and enteroviruses (ex. Polioviruses, echoviruses, Coxsackie viruses) have all been preserved in ice and/or permafrost. Scientists have determined three characteristics necessary for a virus to successfully preserve in ice: high abundance, ability to transport in ice, and ability to resume disease cycles upon being released from ice. A direct infection from permafrost or ice to humans has not been demonstrated; such viruses are typically spread through other organisms or abiotic mechanisms.

A study of late Pleistocene Siberian permafrost samples from Kolyma Lowland (an east siberian lowland) used DNA isolation and gene cloning (specifically 16S rRNA genes) to determine which phyla these microorganisms belonged to. This technique allowed a comparison of known microorganisms to their newly discovered samples and revealed eight phylotypes, which belonged to the phyla Actinomycetota and Pseudomonadota.

Plants 
In 2012, Russian researchers proved that permafrost can serve as a natural repository for ancient life forms by reviving of Silene stenophylla from 30,000 year old tissue found in an Ice Age squirrel burrow in the Siberian permafrost. This is the oldest plant tissue ever revived. The plant was fertile, producing white flowers and viable seeds. The study demonstrated that tissue can survive ice preservation for tens of thousands of years.

Extraterrestrial permafrost

Other issues 
The International Permafrost Association (IPA) is an integrator of issues regarding permafrost. It convenes International Permafrost Conferences, undertakes special projects such as preparing databases, maps, bibliographies, and glossaries, and coordinates international field programmes and networks. Among other issues addressed by the IPA are: Problems for construction on permafrost owing to the change of soil properties of the ground on which structures are placed and the biological processes in permafrost, e.g. the preservation of organisms frozen in situ.

Construction on permafrost 
Yakutsk is one of two large cities in the world built in areas of continuous permafrost—that is, where the frozen soil forms an unbroken, below-zero sheet. The other is Norilsk, in Krasnoyarsk Krai, Russia.

Building on permafrost is difficult because the heat of the building (or pipeline) can warm the permafrost and destabilize the structure. Warming can result in thawing of the soil and its consequent weakening of support for a structure as the ice content turns to water; alternatively, where structures are built on piles, warming can cause movement through creep because of the change of friction on the piles even as the soil remains frozen.

Three common solutions include: using foundations on wood piles, a technique pioneered by Soviet engineer Mikhail Kim in Norilsk; building on a thick gravel pad (usually 1–2 metres/3.3–6.6 feet thick); or using anhydrous ammonia heat pipes. The Trans-Alaska Pipeline System uses heat pipes built into vertical supports to prevent the pipeline from sinking and the Qingzang railway in Tibet employs a variety of methods to keep the ground cool, both in areas with frost-susceptible soil. Permafrost may necessitate special enclosures for buried utilities, called "utilidors".

Thawing permafrost represents a threat to industrial infrastructure. In May 2020 thawing permafrost at Norilsk-Taimyr Energy's Thermal Power Plant No. 3 caused an oil storage tank to collapse, spilling 6,000 tonnes of diesel into the land, 15,000 into the water. The rivers Ambarnaya, Daldykan and many smaller rivers were polluted. The pollution reached the lake Pyasino that is important to the water supply of the entire Taimyr Peninsula. State of emergency at the federal level was declared. Many buildings and infrastructure are built on permafrost, which cover 65% of Russian territory, and all those can be damaged as it thaws.  The 2020 Norilsk oil spill has been described as the second-largest oil spill in modern Russian history. The thawing can also cause leakage of toxic elements from sites of buried toxic waste.

There is no ground water available in an area underlain with permafrost. Any substantial settlement or installation needs to make some alternative arrangement to obtain water.

See also
Global Terrestrial Network for Permafrost
Pleistocene & Permafrost Foundation

References

External links

Permafrostwatch University of Alaska Fairbanks
Infographics about permafrost
International Permafrost Association (IPA)
Alpine permafrost monitoring network - permanet 
Center for Permafrost
Map of permafrost in Antarctica.
Permafrost – what is it? – YouTube (Alfred Wegener Institute)

 
Geography of the Arctic
Geomorphology
Montane ecology
Patterned grounds
Pedology
Periglacial landforms
1940s neologisms
Cryosphere